Clint Eastwood is a reggae album by The Upsetters.

Track listing

Side one
"Return of the Ugly"
"For a Few Dollars More"
"Prisoner of Love"
"Dry Acid"
"Rightful Ruler"
"Clint Eastwood"

Side two
"Taste of Killing"
"Selassie"
"What Is This"
"Ain't No Love"
"My Mob"
"I've Caught You"

1970 albums
The Upsetters albums
Albums produced by Lee "Scratch" Perry
Cultural depictions of Clint Eastwood